Lophium is a genus of fungi in the family Mytilinidiaceae. It was described by Swedish mycologist Elias Magnus Fries in 1818.

References

Mytilinidiales
Ascomycota genera
Taxa named by Elias Magnus Fries
Taxa described in 1818